Mahn Thet San (1930–2008) was a Burmese academic and civil servant of ethnic Mon descent, known for his work in preserving Mon literature and culture. Born in Kawhnat village in Moulmein Township, he was educated at the University of Illinois, where he earned master's and doctoral degrees in chemistry in 1955 and 1957 respectively. He served as the deputy minister of the Ministry of Industry, and as rector of Moulmein College and Bassein Degree College.

Thet San died on 10 October 2008 at his home in Mayangone Township, Yangon and was subsequently buried at Yayway Cemetery. He was 78 (in his 79th year).

References

Burmese people of Mon descent
Academic staff of Mawlamyine University
Burmese civil servants
1930 births
2008 deaths
People from Mon State